Mario Rodríguez (born 1909) was a Cuban pitcher in the Negro leagues in the 1930s.

A native of Santo Domingo, Cuba, Rodríguez played for the Cuban Stars (East) in 1934. In four recorded appearances on the mound, he posted a 6.05 ERA over 19.1 innings.

References

External links
Baseball statistics and player information from Baseball-Reference Black Baseball Stats and Seamheads

1909 births
Date of birth missing
Year of death missing
Place of death missing
People from Santo Domingo, Cuba
Cuban Stars (East) players
Cuban baseball players
Baseball pitchers